Jelševica is a small dispersed settlement in the Municipality of Zagorje ob Savi in central Slovenia. It lies just east of the main motorway from Ljubljana to Maribor. The area is part of the traditional region of Upper Carniola. It is now included with the rest of the municipality in the Central Sava Statistical Region.

References

External links

Jelševica on Geopedia

Populated places in the Municipality of Zagorje ob Savi